The 2022 election to the Glasgow City Council took place on 5 May 2022 on the same day as the 31 other Scottish local government elections. The election used the 23 wards created following the Local Government Boundary Commission for Scotland's 5th Review, with 85 councillors being elected. Each ward elected either 3 or 4 members, using the STV electoral system.

Similar to the last election in 2017, the Scottish National Party (SNP) won the most seats and formed a minority administration. After the election, the SNP reached a working agreement with the Scottish Greens, reflecting the similar nature to the co-operation agreement in the Scottish Government but the difference being that they would not form part of the administration.

Background

Composition
Since the previous election, several changes in the composition of the council occurred. Most were changes to the political affiliation of councillors including SNP councillors Glenn Elder, Russell Robertson, Michael Cullen and Elspeth Kerr and Green councillor Martin Bartos who resigned from their respective parties to become independents. Labour councillor Anne McTaggart defected and joined the SNP and Conservative councillor Tony Curtis resigned from the party before he was disqualified from the council for not attending a meeting in six months. Labour councillor Jim Coleman was also disqualified for not attending a meeting in six months.

SNP councillors Michelle Ferns and John Letford defected to the Alba Party. Three by-elections were held and resulted in a Labour hold, a Labour gain from Conservative and an SNP gain from Labour. Labour councillor Gary Gray died in February 2022 which left a vacancy on the council which would not be filled as it was less than six months before the election.

Notes

Retiring Councillors

Results

Ward summary

|- class="unsortable" align="centre"
!rowspan=2 align="left"|Ward
!%  
!Seats 
!% 
!Seats 
!% 
!Seats 
!% 
!Seats 
!% 
!Seats 
!% 
!Seats 
!rowspan=2|Total
|- class="unsortable" align="center"
!colspan=2 |SNP
!colspan=2 |Lab
!colspan=2 |Green
!colspan=2 |Conservative
!colspan=2 |Lib Dem
!colspan=2 |Others
|-
|align="left"|Linn
| 33.40
| 2
|31.98
|2
|6.05
|0
|11.50
|0
|6.36
|0
|10.71
|0
|4
|-
|align="left"|Newlands/Auldburn
| 33.07
| 1
|32.81
|1
|8.43
|1
|11.33
|0
|2.31
|0
|12.04
|0
|3
|-
|align="left"|Greater Pollok
|38.46
|2
| 43.70
| 2
|3.94
|0
|9.39
|0
|1.35
|0
|3.16
|0
|4
|-
|align="left"|Cardonald
|39.20
|2
| 42.03
| 2
|5.38
|0
|8.81
|0
|1.78
|0
|2.79
|0
|4
|-
|align="left"|Govan
|38.30
|2
|29.68
|1
|15.10
|1
|9.98
|0
|1.50
|0
|5.44
|0
|4
|-
|align="left"|Pollokshields
|30.56
|2
|23.36
|1
|22.10
|1
|12.54
|0
|2.98
|0
|8.45
|0
|4
|-
|align="left"|Langside
|32.35
|2
|26.70
|1
|27.94
|1
|8.58
|0
|1.98
|0
|2.45
|0
|4
|-
|align="left"|Southside Central
|34.27
|1
|31.51
|2
|18.08
|1
|4.11
|0
|1.43
|0
|10.60
|0
|4
|-
|align="left"|Calton
|39.38
|2
|34.19
|2
|12.71
|0
|10.44
|0
|1.30
|0
|1.98
|0
|4
|-
|align="left"|Anderston/City/Yorkhill
|33.03
|2
|30.05
|1
|25.84
|1
|6.68
|0
|2.45
|0
|1.95
|0
|4
|-
|align="left"|Hillhead
|28.65
|1
|22.12
|1
|36.20
|1
|6.70
|0
|5.44
|0
|0.88
|0
|3
|-
|align="left"|Victoria Park
|26.59
|1
|28.39
|1
|23.40
|1
|15.83
|0
|4.15
|0
|1.63
|0
|3
|-
|align="left"|Garscadden/Scotstounhill
|40.73
|2
|38.74
|2
|8.25
|0
|10.27
|0
|2.00
|0
|colspan="2" 
|4
|-
|align="left"|Drumchapel/Anniesland
|37.93
|2
|38.18
|2
|6.06
|0
|9.54
|0
|1.63
|0
|6.67
|0
|4
|-
|align="left"|Maryhill
|42.12
|2
|33.99
|1
|12.29
|0
|8.18
|0
|2.40
|0
|1.02
|0
|3
|-
|align="left"|Canal
|38.12
|2
|35.45
|2
|5.56
|0
|5.16
|0
|1.17
|0
|14.54
|0
|4
|-
|align="left"|Springburn/Robroyston
|41.22
|2
|41.73
|2
|4.24
|0
|9.04
|0
|2.11
|0
|1.65
|0
|4
|-
|align="left"|East Centre
|42.12
|2
|37.31
|2
|3.45
|0
|9.89
|0
|1.29
|0
|5.94
|0
|4
|-
|align="left"|Shettleston
|35.36
|1
|39.23
|2
|5.02
|0
|16.73
|1
|1.43
|0
|2.23
|0
|4
|-
|align="left"|Baillieston
|38.17
|1
|38.28
|1
|4.11
|0
|16.62
|1
|2.83
|0
|colspan="2" 
|3
|-
|align="left"|North East
|42.59
|1
|43.97
|2
|3.02
|0
|8.64
|0
|colspan="2" 
|1.78
|0
|3
|-
|align="left"|Dennistoun
|35.12
|1
|29.19
|1
|26.19
|1
|6.20
|0
|1.76
|0
|1.54
|0
|3
|-
|align="left"|Partick East/Kelvindale
|28.35
|1
|32.23
|2
|20.90
|1
|13.33
|0
|3.79
|0
|1.40
|0
|4
|- class="unsortable" class="sortbottom"
!align="left"|Total
!35.51
!37
!33.77
!36
!13.69
!10
!10.24
!2
!2.45
!0
!4.34
!0
!85
|}

Ward results

Linn
2012: 2 × Labour; 1 × SNP; 1 × Liberal Democrat
2017: 2 × SNP; 1 × Labour; 1 × Conservative
2022: 2 × SNP; 2 × Labour
2017-2022 Change: 1 × Labour gain from Conservative

Newlands/Auldburn
2012: 2 × Labour; 1 × SNP
2017: 1 × SNP; 1 × Labour; 1 × Conservative
2022: 1 × SNP; 1 × Labour; 1 × Green
2017-2022 Change: 1 × Green gain from Conservative

Greater Pollok
2012: 2 × Labour; 2 × SNP
2017: 2 × Labour; 2 × SNP
2022: 2 × Labour; 2 × SNP
2017-2022 Change: No change

Cardonald
2017: 2 × SNP; 2 × Labour
2022: 2 × SNP; 2 × Labour
2017-2022 Change: No change

Govan
2012: 2 × Labour; 1 × SNP; 1 × GlasgowFirst
2017: 2 × SNP; 1 × Labour; 1 × Green
2022: 2 × SNP; 1 × Labour; 1 × Green
2017-2022 Change: No change

Pollokshields
2012: 1 × Labour; 1 × SNP; 1 × Conservative
2017: 1 × SNP; 1 × Conservative; 1 × Labour; 1 × Green 
2022: 2 × SNP; 1 × Labour; 1 × Green
2017-2022 Change: 1 × SNP gain from Conservative

Langside
2012: 1 × SNP; 1 × Labour; 1 × Green
2017: 2 × SNP; 1 × Labour; 1 × Green 
2022: 2 × SNP; 1 × Labour; 1 × Green
2017-2022 Change: No Change

Southside Central
2012: 2 × Labour; 2 × SNP
2017: 2 × SNP; 2 × Labour
2022: 2 × Labour; 1 × SNP; 1 × Green
2017-2022 Change: 1 × Green gain from SNP

Calton
2012: 2 × Labour; 1 × SNP
2017: 2 × SNP; 1 × Labour; 1 × Conservative 
2022: 2 × SNP; 2 × Labour
2017-2022 Change: 1 × Labour gain from Conservative

Anderston/City/Yorkhill
2012: 2 × Labour; 1 × SNP; 1 × Green
2017: 2 × SNP; 1 × Labour; 1 × Green
2022: 2 × SNP; 1 × Labour; 1 × Green
2017-2022 Change: No Change

Hillhead
2012: 2x Labour; 1 × SNP; 1 × Green
2017: 1 × Green; 1 × SNP; 1 × Labour
2022: 1 × Green, 1 × SNP; 1 × Labour
2017-2022 Change: No change

Victoria Park
2017: 1 × SNP; 1 × Conservative; 1 × Labour
2022: 1 × Labour; 1 × SNP; 1 × Green
2017-2022 Change: 1 × Green gain from Conservative

Garscadden/Scotstounhill
2012: 3 × Labour; 1 × SNP
2017: 2 × Labour; 2 × SNP
2022: 2 × SNP; 2 × Labour
2017-2022 Change: No Change

Drumchapel/Anniesland
2012: 3 × Labour; 1 × SNP
2017: 2 × Labour; 2 × SNP
2022: 2 × Labour; 2 × SNP
2017-2022 Change: No change

Maryhill
2017: 2 × SNP; 1 × Labour
2022: 2 × SNP; 1 × Labour
2017-2022 Change: No Change

Canal
2012: 2 × Labour; 1 × SNP; 1 × Green
2017: 2 × SNP; 2 × Labour
2022: 2 × SNP; 2 × Labour
2017-2022 Change: No Change

Springburn/Robroyston
2017: 2 × Labour; 2 × SNP
2022: 2 × Labour; 2 × SNP
2017-2022 Change: No Change

East Centre
2012: 3 × Labour; 1 × SNP
2017: 2 × Labour; 1 × SNP
2022: 2 × SNP; 2 × Labour
2017-2022 Change: No Change

Shettleston
2012: 3 × Labour; 1 × SNP
2017: 2 × SNP; 1 × Labour; 1 × Conservative
2022: 2 × Labour; 1 × SNP; 1 × Conservative
2017-2022 Change: 1 × Labour gain from SNP

Baillieston
2012: 2 × Labour; 2 × SNP
2017: 1 × SNP; 1 × Labour; 1 × Conservative 
2022: 1 × Labour; 1 × SNP; 1 × Conservative
2017-2022 Change: No Change

North East
2012: 3 × Labour; 1 × SNP
2017: 2 × SNP; 1 × Labour
2022: 2 × Labour; 1 × SNP
2017-2022 Change: 1 × Labour gain from SNP

Dennistoun
2017: 1 × Labour; 1 × SNP; 1 × Green
2022: 1 × SNP; 1 × Labour; 1 × Green
2017-2022 Change: No Change

Partick East/Kelvindale
2017: 1 × SNP; 1 × Conservative; 1 × Labour; 1 × Green
2022: 2 × Labour; 1 × SNP; 1 × Green
2017-2022 Change: 1 × Labour gain from Conservative

By-elections since 2022

Linn (November 2022)
There was a by-election in Linn to replace Labour councillor and former group leader Malcolm Cunning, who died in September 2022.

Notes

References

Glasgow
2022
City Council election, 2022